Taxes in Uruguay are taxes collected mainly by the General Taxation Directorate (DGI) in Uruguay.

A major tax reform bill came into force on 1 July 2007 with the number 18083. Nevertheless, something important remained: Uruguay applies the source principle, with investments located and activities performed outside Uruguay remaining untouched.

Tax rates
 Value added taxes (VAT): basically 22%, but some goods (pharmaceutical, etc.) are taxed with 10%, and fruits and vegetables are not taxed. As of August 2014, the Financial Inclusion Law established a 4% tax deduction for sales with debit cards and 2% for credit cards.
 Corporate tax: it used to be 30%, since 2007 it was lowered to 25%, but special dispositions can bring this to 33%.
 Individual income tax: Since 2007 there is a progressive scale of taxation, with a non-taxable minimum. The payroll tax is part of the same tax scheme.
 Wealth tax: There is a non-taxable minimum  which leaves the big majority of Uruguayans out of this duty. A progressive scale of taxation ranges from 0.7% to 2.75%.

Other taxes
 The Schools Tax taxing urban rural estate was collected by the National Administration of Public Education and, since 2018, is collected direct by DGI.
 Regional administrations in the country can establish, collect and control certain taxes through their respective Departmental Councils. The most significant local taxes include the Real Estate Tax, Vehicle Registration Fee and the Food Analysis Tax.

See also
Economy of Uruguay
Revenue stamps of Uruguay

References

External links
Dirección General Impositiva (DGI) 

Economy of Uruguay
Uruguay